John Alexander Armstrong Jr. (4 May 1922 – 2010) was Professor Emeritus of political science at the University of Wisconsin-Madison.

Born in St. Augustine, Florida on 4 May 1922, he entered the University of Chicago at age 20 where he received both bachelor's and master's degrees. However, the date of his graduation was delayed by his enlistment in the U.S. Army in Belgium during World War II, from 1944 to 1945. Such experience appears to have certain impacts upon the direction of his academic research on nationalism in Europe afterwards.

He entered Columbia University for further study in 1950 and received a Ph.D. three years later.

His earlier works focus on nationalism and ideologies in Europe, especially Ukraine and Russia during the 1950s and 1960s. The most influential work of his is the path-breaking Nations before Nationalism (1982) which firstly systematically expressed the longue durée of ethnic identity and has inspired theorists of ethnosymbolism including Anthony D. Smith.

Selected publications
(1962) Ideology, politics, and government in the Soviet Union: an introduction, British Library system no.: 011535915; 2nd ed. (1967) British Library system no.: 010265522; 4th ed. (1986), 
Ukrainian Nationalism 1939-1945, British Library system no.: 011535954; 2nd ed., ; 3rd ed. (1990), 
(1982) Nations before Nationalism,

References 

1922 births
2010 deaths
Scholars of nationalism
American political scientists
United States Army personnel of World War II
University of Chicago alumni